Game Over, Man! is a 2018 American action comedy film directed by Kyle Newacheck, written by Anders Holm, and starring Holm, Adam DeVine, and Blake Anderson, all of whom previously collaborated on the sitcom Workaholics. It follows three down-on-their-luck housekeepers who must save the day when the Los Angeles hotel where they work is taken hostage. The film was released on March 23, 2018 on Netflix, but was panned by critics.

Plot
Three friends, the Dewd Crew, work as housekeepers at a luxury hotel in Los Angeles and are about to pitch their power suit to get it financed by their potential benefactor Awadi, the Bey of Tunisia.

They pitch their proposal at the bey's party, but the hotel manager confiscates the check the bey gives them and fires them. Moments later Awadi is taken hostage by terrorists in a Die Hard-type scenario. 

The inexperienced trio narrowly escapes and, realising it's needed, rise to the occasion. Alexxx, Darren and Joel outwit two of the terrorists somewhat by accident. Meanwhile the Bey is being forced to access information for an offshore account which the terrorists' hacker is trying to drain. The trio somehow crash through the window where the hacking is in progress, thwarting it. 

However, Mr. Ahmad, Bey Awadi's personal attachè, is shown to be the real mastermind behind the terrorists, discovered when Alexxx calls him with the hacker's phone. On television he demands 500 million or he will kill one hostage every 15 minutes. 

The trio plan to overcome the terrorists by pumping Salvia into the conference room where everyone is. But, as they are fighting amongst themselves, they aren't able to follow through. 

One of the terrorists, whose life partner the trio accidentally killed, takes them to the hotel's spa to torture them. They trick and kill him, then rig him with a version of their invention, a remote controlled power suit. Sending him into the conference room as a distraction, they themselves enter with automatic weapons blazing.

Mr. Ahmad soon takes control back, heading to the helicopter on the roof. The trio follows with what seems to be the ransom money. They convince him to take the money but leave Bey, as the copter heads off it explodes as they rigged one of the bags with the exploding collars. 

The trio saves the lives of the remaining hostages in the building, one of which gets them rich developing a video game based on them.

Cast

 Adam DeVine as Alexxx
 Anders Holm as Darren
 Blake Anderson as Joel
 Utkarsh Ambudkar as Bae Awadi
 Aya Cash as Cassie
 Neal McDonough as Conrad
 Daniel Stern as Mitch
 Jamie Demetriou as Mr. Ahmad
 Rhona Mitra as Erma
 Sam Richardson as Donald
 Steve Howey as Rich
 Mac Brandt as Jared
 Geno Segers as Sal
 William B. Davis as Ray Security
 Roe Hartrampf as Alan

Several celebrities have cameo appearances as themselves, including Shaggy, Sugar Lyn Beard, Fred Armisen, Joel McHale, Flying Lotus, Steve-O, Donald Faison, Action Bronson, Chris Pontius, and Mark Cuban. Jillian Bell, Chloe Bridges and King Bach also make brief appearances.

Production
On June 9, 2016, Netflix announced that it was producing Game Over, Man! with producers including Seth Rogen, Evan Goldberg, and James Weaver via their Point Grey banner; and Scott Rudin and Eli Bush via Scott Rudin Productions. Also producing are Adam DeVine, Anders Holm, Blake Anderson, and Kyle Newacheck, who collectively form the comedy group Mail Order Comedy, as well as Isaac Horne of Avalon Management.

Release
The film held its official premiere on March 21, 2018 at the Regency Village Theater in Los Angeles, California.

Reception

Critical reception
Game Over, Man! has been met with a generally negative response from critics. On the review aggregation website Rotten Tomatoes, the film holds  approval rating with an average rating of  based on  reviews. Metacritic, which uses a weighted average, assigned the film a score of 32 out of 100 based on 8 critics, indicating "generally unfavorable reviews".

In a negative review, Glenn Kenny of The New York Times said, "This almost laugh-free comedy...is distinguished by a relentless level of outrageous yet strangely listless vulgarity." In a similarly negative review, Varietys Monica Castillo said "Game Over, Man! is a movie with few original ideas, plenty of tropes, and not enough love for the Bill Paxton Aliens character who made its eponymous catchphrase popular." Indiewires David Ehrlich was more mixed saying, "Game Over, Man! becomes to Workaholics what Keanu was to Key & Peele — a sporadically funny riff on a formula that worked much better in small doses. You know it’s a Netflix joint, because it almost feels designed to be half-watched in the background; an overly loud piece of muzak." In a somewhat positive review, Michael Rechtshaffen of the Los Angeles Times said "The guys occasionally over-reach for irreverence, director and fellow Workaholics veteran Kyle Newacheck mainly succeeds in delivering the most defiantly outrageous farce since Borat."

References

External links

2018 films
2018 action comedy films
English-language Netflix original films
American action comedy films
Point Grey Pictures films
Films produced by Evan Goldberg
Films produced by Seth Rogen
Films produced by Scott Rudin
Films scored by Steve Jablonsky
Films set in hotels
Films set in Los Angeles
Films shot in Los Angeles
2018 directorial debut films
2010s English-language films
2010s American films
Gay-related films
LGBT-related buddy films